Zdravko Ceraj (4 October 1920 – 6 October 2011) was a Croatian long-distance runner who competed for SFR Yugoslavia in the 1952 Summer Olympics. At the 1951 Mediterranean Games, he won a silver medal in 5000 m event. He was born in Bjelovar and died in Zagreb.
He competed for Partizan Belgrade.

References

1920 births
2011 deaths
Croatian male long-distance runners
Yugoslav male long-distance runners
Olympic athletes of Yugoslavia
Athletes (track and field) at the 1952 Summer Olympics
Mediterranean Games silver medalists for Yugoslavia
Mediterranean Games bronze medalists for Yugoslavia
Athletes (track and field) at the 1951 Mediterranean Games
Mediterranean Games medalists in athletics